The House of Augustus, or the Domus Augusti (not to be confused with the Domus Augustana), is situated on the Palatine Hill in Rome, Italy. This house has been identified as the primary place of residence for the emperor Augustus.

The Domus Augusti is located near the so-called Hut of Romulus and other sites that have connections to the foundation of Rome.

History 

The House of Augustus is well attested in ancient literary sources. Suetonius indicates that Augustus moved into the House of Quintus Hortensius on the Palatine, relocating from his original home in the Roman Forum. Velleius reports that Augustus purchased the land and house of Hortentius in 41–40 BC. Soon after, this spot was struck by lightning, and so Augustus declared this a public property and dedicated a temple to Apollo Palatinus, as Apollo had helped Augustus in his victory over Sextus Pompey in 36 BC. Because of this "pious act" the Senate decreed that the property around this area should be given to Augustus from public funds. An oak crown, said to have adorned the front door, was a tribute to this senatorial dedication in 27 BC.

The house was destroyed by fire in 3 AD, but was rebuilt and made state property.

Excavations 

In 1865, Pietro Rosa began excavations at what is now called the House of Livia. His excavations, part of a larger program commissioned by Napoleon III, included a superficial excavation of the Domus Augusti, located to the south. In 1937, Alfonso Bartoli did further surveys of the area and found archaeological remnants of collapsed vaults. In 1956, extensive excavations began under Gianfilippo Carettoni. His initial excavations revealed a structure, consisting of a set of rooms, which has now been identified as part of a larger complex known as Peristyle A. He attributed this structure to Augustus based on its proximity to the nearby Temple of Apollo.

In the first decade of the 2000s further work revealed that the original peristyle was part of a much larger house. A restoration program was completed in 2008, giving the public access.

Archaeology

The plan of the site is based on two peristyles bordered by rooms. Between each peristyle sits the Temple of Apollo Palatinus. Most of the remains are around Peristyle A (P2), as much of Peristyle B (P1) was destroyed by the later Palace of Domitian. This entire site occupies ca. 8,600 m2.

The house was built on two terraces.

Domus Augusti

The house encompasses the northern rooms on Peristyle A.

After building the Temple of Apollo Palatinus, Augustus destroyed some of the rooms, reconfigured the villa building a large Peristyle A and rooms over the original house.

The visible structure consists of two rows of rooms built in opus quadratum, divided into eastern and western sections. The rooms to the western side of this complex may have been the private living quarters and have extensive wall decorations. One room, known as the Room of the Masks, features perspective architectural paintings and theatrical masks, typical of the Second Style of Roman wall painting. Another room features bows of pine, very similar to the House of Livia. These two rooms date to 30 BC.

The eastern rooms encircled a large central room, which was open toward the south and perhaps served a public function. These rooms were decorated with geometric floor mosaics.

Peristyle A (P2)
This peristyle sits just west of the Temple of Apollo. It dates to approximately 39 BC and has been identified as the private quarters of the villa. There is little archaeological evidence that remains, with the exception of a portion of the tufa peristyle.

Peristyle B (P1)

Peristyle B lies a symmetrical position across on the other side of the Temple and was constructed between 39 and 36 BC. It perhaps served a public function. However, the Palace of Domitian (Domus Augustana) has disturbed much of this area, which is possibly how the Domus Augustana received its name.

Temple of Apollo Palatinus 
Initially identified as the Temple of Jupiter Victor, the Temple of Apollo Palatinus is located between both peristyles, on a higher terrace. It was finished in 28 BC, confirmed by the findings of Republican houses underneath it. The podium was 24 m by 45 m, and the Temple featured barrel vaults and Corinthian capitals. Built of Luna marble and concrete, it housed the cult statues of Apollo, Diana and Latona, in addition to the Sibylline books.

Issues of identification 
Suetonius (c. 70–130 AD), lawyer and secretary of the imperial palace, wrote of the House of Augustus:

He lived at first near the Forum Romanum, afterwards on the Palatine in a modest dwelling remarkable neither for size or elegance, having but a short colonnade with columns of local stone and rooms without any marble decorations or handsome pavements. For more than 40 years he used the same bedroom in winter and summer.

The literary accounts have ignited debates over the identification of this monument in recent years, and have called into question the identification of this complex as the House of Augustus. Since recent excavation has revealed a very large villa plan, some are inclined to doubt the statement of Suetonius. Others have instead suggested that this villa would have been too luxurious and large to be the House of Augustus that is described in the literary sources.

See also

 List of ancient monuments in Rome

References

External links

Tourist attractions in Rome
Ancient palaces in Rome
Augustus
Palatine Hill
Rome R. X Campitelli
Augustan building projects